Are You Washed in the Blood? is a well-known Christian hymn written in 1878 in Ohio by Elisha Hoffman, a Presbyterian minister from Pennsylvania; it was first published in Spiritual Songs for Gospel Meetings and the Sunday School.  The song "became a marching song for the Salvation Army." The song contains many Bible references and allusions, including to: "They have washed their robes and made them white in the blood of the Lamb" from Revelation 7:14. The song has been recorded by many notable recording artists, including Johnny Cash, Alan Jackson, and Ernest Stoneman's Dixie Mountaineers in the Bristol Sessions (1927).  It can be heard in the Paul Schrader film, First Reformed, as well as the video game Wasteland 3 under the name "Blood of the Lamb"

References

American Christian hymns
1878 songs
19th-century hymns
Gospel songs
Bluegrass songs
Public domain music